Edward Sampson may refer to:

 Ed Sampson (1921–1974), American ice hockey player
 Ted Sampson (born 1935), British sprinter
 Edward Sampson (priest) (fl. 1728–1736), Irish Anglican priest